Samuel Jickell (18 August 1856–8 May 1939) was a New Zealand civil engineer. He was born in Stockton-on-Tees, Durham, England on 18 August 1856.
Jickell arrived in Palmerston North in December 1903. He settled in Cook Street with his wife and family. He was a fully qualified borough engineer and had had experience in water systems in Australia and other parts of New Zealand before he moved to Palmy. He installed earthenware sewer pipes running throughout all main borough streets except the low-lying Hokowhitu area. Before then people had to dump their night soil where PNGHS is today. He stayed with the council till his retirement in 1919.

References

1856 births
1939 deaths
New Zealand civil engineers
People from Stockton-on-Tees
English emigrants to New Zealand